Włodzimierz Nalazek (born 10 April 1957) is a Polish volleyball player. He competed in the men's tournament at the 1980 Summer Olympics.

References

External links
 

1957 births
Living people
Volleyball players from Warsaw
Polish men's volleyball players
Olympic volleyball players of Poland
Volleyball players at the 1980 Summer Olympics
Legia Warsaw (volleyball) players
AZS Olsztyn players